Sea Legends is an MS-DOS based game developed by the Russian company Mir Dialogue (later Nival), published by New Media Generation (in Russia) and Ocean of America (North America) and distributed by GTE Entertainment. First big project by the veteran of the Russian gaming industry Sergey Orlovskiy, it was among the pioneers of the voxel technology in video games, combining 3D environment with 2D sprites, which allowed for an open world sea basin and real-time naval battles.

Sea Legends was inspired by Sid Meier's Pirates, although it follows an original plot which also takes place in the Caribbean in the 17th century. The game features rather complex models of ship management and trading system. Though it received little recognition at the time of its release, with years it grew into a cult classic.

In Sea Legends the player takes the role of Captain Richard Grey, a British sailor of noble heritage who has to use his knowledge to accomplish a series of different sea-based missions aboard his Frigate, the Hefestus. However, it is possible for the player to deviate from linear gameplay and become a pirate. As a pirate the player can freely explore the Caribbean Sea looting ships, attacking town ports and hunting for treasure.

References

External links
Gamespot
GameFAQs

1995 video games
DOS games
DOS-only games
Video games about pirates
Video games developed in Russia
Video games set in Antigua and Barbuda
Video games set in Barbados
Video games set in Belize
Video games set in Colombia
Video games set in Cuba
Video games set in Curaçao
Video games set in the Dominican Republic
Video games set in Guadeloupe
Video games set in Haiti
Video games set in Jamaica
Video games set in Martinique
Video games set in Panama
Video games set in Puerto Rico
Video games set in Saint Kitts and Nevis
Video games set in Sint Eustatius
Video games set in Venezuela
Ocean Software games